One third of Tunbridge Wells Borough Council in Kent, England, is elected each year, followed by one year without election. Since the last boundary changes in 2002, 48 councillors have been elected from 20 wards.

Political control
The first election to the council was held in 1973, initially operating as a shadow authority before coming into its powers on 1 April 1974. Political control of the council since 1973 has been held by the following parties:

Leadership
The leaders of the council since 1998 have been:

Council elections
1973 Tunbridge Wells Borough Council election
1976 Tunbridge Wells Borough Council election (new ward boundaries)
1979 Tunbridge Wells Borough Council election
1980 Tunbridge Wells Borough Council election
1982 Tunbridge Wells Borough Council election
1983 Tunbridge Wells Borough Council election
1984 Tunbridge Wells Borough Council election
1986 Tunbridge Wells Borough Council election
1987 Tunbridge Wells Borough Council election (borough boundary changes took place but the number of seats remained the same)
1988 Tunbridge Wells Borough Council election
1990 Tunbridge Wells Borough Council election
1991 Tunbridge Wells Borough Council election
1992 Tunbridge Wells Borough Council election
1994 Tunbridge Wells Borough Council election (borough boundary changes took place but the number of seats remained the same)
1995 Tunbridge Wells Borough Council election (borough boundary changes took place but the number of seats remained the same)
1996 Tunbridge Wells Borough Council election
1998 Tunbridge Wells Borough Council election — Con 27, LD 12, Lab 7, Ind 2
1999 Tunbridge Wells Borough Council election — Con 28, LD 12, Lab 7, Ind 1
2000 Tunbridge Wells Borough Council election — Con 31, LD 11, Lab 5, Ind 1
2002 Tunbridge Wells Borough Council election (new ward boundaries) — Con 34 LD 11, Lab 3
2003 Tunbridge Wells Borough Council election — Con 33, LD 12, Lab 3
2004 Tunbridge Wells Borough Council election — Con 35, LD 12, Lab 1
2006 Tunbridge Wells Borough Council election — Con 38, LD 9, Lab 1
2007 Tunbridge Wells Borough Council election — Con 41, LD 7
2008 Tunbridge Wells Borough Council election — Con 44, LD 4
2010 Tunbridge Wells Borough Council election — Con 42, LD 6
2011 Tunbridge Wells Borough Council election
2012 Tunbridge Wells Borough Council election — Con 39, LD 6, Lab 1, UKIP 1, Ind 1
2015 Tunbridge Wells Borough Council election
2016 Tunbridge Wells Borough Council election
2018 Tunbridge Wells Borough Council election
2019 Tunbridge Wells Borough Council election
2021 Tunbridge Wells Borough Council election
2022 Tunbridge Wells Borough Council election
(figures are the resulting councillors per party after the election)

Borough result maps

By-election results

1997–2001

2001–2005

2005–2009

2009–2013

2013–2017

2017–2021

2021-2025

References

By-election results

External links
Tunbridge Wells Council

 
Politics of the Borough of Tunbridge Wells
Council elections in Kent
District council elections in England